Sanatan Sardar was a veteran Indian politician and a tribal leader. Sardar was a minor irrigation minister from 1985-87 in undivided Bihar, he thrice represented Potka as Janata Dal (1977–82), BJP (1982-85) and Congress (1985–90) MLA.

Early life 
Veteran leader Sanatan Sardar was born in Roladih village in Potka block of the district, in a Bhumij tribal family. Sardar left behind his wife, two sons, two daughters and four grandchildren.

He was teacher by profession and served Potka High School as headmaster before venturing into active politics.

Political journey 
Sanatan Sardar was an honest and sincere leader and played an important role in the progress of Potka. Sardar represented Potka as Janata Dal MLA (1977–82) and later as BJP MLA (1982–85) and in his last term he represented the constituency as Congress MLA (1985–90). He was also a minister for minor irrigation in erstwhile Bihar in 1985-87.

Despite holding a high position in the erstwhile Bihar government, he never traveled in a car or any luxury vehicle, he always preferred to walk on foot. Even till his last breath he lived in a small mud house. Sanatanji was really a down to earth person.

Death 
Veteran tribal leader and three-term MLA from Potka reserve seat, Sanatan Sardar died on Thursday, 10 October 2013 after prolonged illness.

The 78-year-old Sardar, breathed his last at his ancestral house in Roladih village in Potka block of the district. Sardar was suffering from heart disease and fluctuating blood sugar levels, and was admitted to RIMS for treatment. The politicians across party-line expressed condolence on the demise of the veteran leader.

"Sanatanji was a down to earth person. I pray to God to give strength to his family to overcome this grief," said district Congress president, Ravinder Jha following his return from the last rites of the departed leader.

Political fraternity of the city has expressed deep sorrow over his demise. When contacted senior Congress leader SRA Rizwi Chabban said, his death is a huge loss to people of the State.

His last journey was taken out from his residence in Potka in which several party leaders and well wishers participated.

See also 
Potka
Amulya Sardar
Maneka Sardar
Sanjib Sardar

References 

2013 deaths
People from East Singhbhum district
Bihar MLAs 1977–1980
Janata Dal politicians
Bharatiya Janata Party politicians from Bihar
Indian National Congress politicians from Bihar
Bihar MLAs 1980–1985
Bihar MLAs 1985–1990
Year of birth missing
Bhumij people
Adivasi politicians